The discography of Loreen, a Swedish pop music singer-songwriter, consists of two studio albums and fifteen singles.

Loreen first appeared as a featured artist on Freestyle's single "Vill ha dig" in 2004, following her appearance on Idol. Loreen returned to the public eye when she took part in Melodifestivalen 2011 with the song "My Heart Is Refusing Me", which she co-wrote with Moh Denebi and Björn Djupström. The single peaked at number nine on the Swedish singles chart. She followed this with the release of "Sober" which gave her a second top 30 hit in Sweden, charting at number twenty-six.

Her major breakthrough occurred when she won the Eurovision Song Contest 2012 for Sweden with the song "Euphoria". The song charted at number one in seventeen countries, including her native Sweden, Germany and Russia. The single also charted top three in the United Kingdom and Spain. The song also received success outside of Europe; it charted in Australia and Japan. Loreen re-released "My Heart Is Refusing Me" as her worldwide second single. The song was considerably less successfully and charted in a handful of countries only. Meanwhile, she released an exclusive single in Sweden—"Crying Out Your Name" which became her fourth top 30 hit, charting at number nineteen after release in October 2012. "We Got the Power" marked Loreen's third worldwide single and appears in the reissue of Loreen's debut album Heal. In Sweden, it charted at number fifty-two.

Loreen competed in Melodifestivalen 2017 with the song "Statements" for a chance to represent Sweden again at the Eurovision Song Contest 2017. On 25 February 2017, she qualified for the Andra chansen round, but lost her duel against Anton Hagman and was subsequently eliminated from the competition. Her sophomore album Ride was released on 24 November 2017.

In 2020, Loreen signed with Universal Music Group, and later that year took part in the Swedish television show Så mycket bättre, where she performed three songs in Swedish, which were later released as singles. She released her first self-written Swedish song "Sötvattentårar" in 2021 and returned to English for her single "Neon Lights" in 2022.

Loreen competed in Melodifestivalen 2023 with the song "Tattoo", which later won the competition and earned Loreen the right to represent Sweden in the Eurovision Song Contest 2023.

Albums

Studio albums

Compilation albums

Notes

Extended plays

Singles

As main artist

As featured artist

Promotional singles

Music videos

References

Notes

Sources

Pop music discographies
Discographies of Swedish artists